United Enterprises & Company Limited (UECL) or most commonly known as United Group is one of the largest Bangladeshi industrial conglomerates. The industries under this conglomerate include power generation, manufacturing, healthcare, education, real estate, shipping, retail services etc.

United Group was established by Hasan Mahmood Raja  and his four friends in Dhaka in 1978. After its foundation about four decades ago, United Group has become one of the most recognized family owned business houses of the nation. It consists of over 40 subsidiaries spanning from power generation to healthcare, education, real-estate, construction, port, yarn spinning, specialized services, shipping and logistics among others.

List of companies

Power Generation

 United Power Generation & Distribution Co. Ltd.

Manufacturing

 United Engineering & Power Services Ltd.
 Comilla Spinning Mills Ltd.
 United Lube Oil Ltd.
 United Polymers Ltd.
 United Sulpho-Chemicals Ltd.
Gunze United Ltd.
 Moulvi Tea Garden

Port and Shipping

 United Shipping & Logistics Services Ltd.
 United Landport Teknaf Ltd.
 United Tank Terminal Ltd.

Real Estate

 United City
 Meghbon Condominium
 United Property Solutions Ltd.
 Neptune Commercial Ltd.
 IPCO Hotels Ltd.
 Neptune Land Development Ltd.
 Neptune Commercial Ltd.
 Gulshan Centre Point

Education

 United International University
 Sir John Wilson School

Healthcare

 United Hospital Ltd.
 United College of Nursing

Technology

 Orange IT Ltd.
 Orange Solution Ltd.

Services

 UNIMART
 United Makkah Madina Travel Assistance Co. Ltd.
 Chef's Table
 United Securities Ltd.
 United Energy Trading Pte. Ltd.

See also
 List of companies of Bangladesh

References

External links
 UECL information

Conglomerate companies of Bangladesh
Organisations based in Dhaka
1978 establishments in Bangladesh